"American Express - Virtual Reality" is the name of a television advertisement for the American Express multinational financial services corporation, created in 1998. Directed by David Kellogg, the spot is one in a series of Visa-bashing ads.

Synopsis 
A man (Raymond O'Connor) finds happiness in a romantic fantasy of himself ballroom dancing in the arms of a red-haired beauty (Angelica Bridges). That is until a store clerk (Brian Klugman) yanks the virtual reality device that produced her. The clerk tells the man that he put himself above his Visa credit card limit. Unlike Visa, American Express has no pre-set limits. A tug-of-war quickly ensues between the man and the clerk, which ultimately results in the police being called.

Reception
The commercial was nominated for an Emmy for Outstanding Commercial, ultimately losing out to Apple Computer's "Think Different" advertisement.

Angelica Bridges was compared to a modern-day Ginger Rogers. Meanwhile, according to the Los Angeles Times, this particular ad helped
Raymond O'Connor, the hapless Visa user, land a role in the film My Giant.

See also
Virtual reality in fiction
Dance in film#Ballroom
American Express#Advertising campaigns

References

External links

Virtual Reality
American television commercials
1998 works
1998 in American television
Virtual reality in fiction
Works about ballroom dance